is a Japanese beauty pageant titleholder who was crowned Miss Earth Japan 2015 that gives her the right to represent Japan at Miss Earth 2015. She was crowned by Miss Earth Japan 2014, Reina Nagata.

Pageantry

Miss Earth Japan
Ayano joined the Miss Earth Japan 2015 pageant held on 11 July 2015. At the end of the event, she was hailed as the winner.

Miss Earth 2015
Winning Miss Earth Japan for 2015, Ayano has Japan's representative to be Miss Earth 2015 and would try to succeed Jamie Herrell as the next Miss Earth.

References

1990 births
Living people
Miss Earth 2015 contestants
Japanese beauty pageant winners
Models from Gunma Prefecture